Robert Wellington Bingham, Jr. (February 14, 1888 – March 8, 1929) was an American football coach.  He served as the head football coach at the Rhode Island State College—now known as the University of Rhode Island— in 1912, compiling record of 6–3.

Born in East Haddam, Connecticut, to Robert Wellington Bingham, Sr., a prominent resident of East Haddam, and Mary T. Varley, Bingham graduated from Brown University in the class of 1911. He died in 1929 and was buried at East Haddam.

Head coaching record

References

External links
 

1888 births
1929 deaths
American football fullbacks
Brown Bears football players
Rhode Island Rams football coaches
People from East Haddam, Connecticut
Players of American football from Connecticut